Kitchen sink realism (or kitchen sink drama) is a British cultural movement that developed in the late 1950s and early 1960s in theatre, art, novels, film and television plays, whose protagonists usually could be described as "angry young men" who were disillusioned with modern society. It used a style of social realism which depicted the domestic situations of working-class Britons, living in cramped rented accommodation and spending their off-hours drinking in grimy pubs, to explore controversial social and political issues ranging from abortion to homelessness. The harsh, realistic style contrasted sharply with the escapism of the previous generation's so-called "well-made plays".

The films, plays and novels employing this style are often set in poorer industrial areas in the North of England, and use the accents and slang heard in those regions. The film It Always Rains on Sunday (1947) is a precursor of the genre and the John Osborne play Look Back in Anger (1956) is thought of as the first of the genre. The gritty love-triangle of Look Back in Anger, for example, takes place in a cramped, one-room flat in the English Midlands. Shelagh Delaney's 1958 play A Taste of Honey (which was made into a film of the same name in 1961) is about a teenage schoolgirl who has an affair with a black sailor, gets pregnant and then moves in with a gay male acquaintance; it raises issues such as class, ethnicity, gender and sexual orientation. The conventions of the genre have continued into the 2000s, finding expression in such television shows as Coronation Street and EastEnders.

The term "Kitchen Sink School" was first used in the visual arts, where the art critic David Sylvester used it in 1954 to describe a group of painters who called themselves the Beaux Arts Quartet, and depicted social realist-type scenes of domestic life.

History
The cultural movement was rooted in the ideals of social realism, an artistic movement expressed in the visual and other realist arts which depicts working class activities. Many artists who subscribed to social realism were painters with socialist political views. While the movement has some commonalities with Socialist Realism, another style of realism which was the "official art" advocated by the governments of the Soviet Union and other Eastern Bloc countries, the two had several differences. While social realism is a broader type of art that realistically depicts subjects of social concern, Socialist realism is characterized by the glorified depiction of socialist values, such as the emancipation of the proletariat, in a realistic manner.

Unlike Socialist realism, social realism is not an official art produced by or under the supervision of the government. The leading characters are often 'anti-heroes' rather than part of a class to be admired, as in Socialist realism. Typically, protagonists in social realism are dissatisfied with their working class lives and the world, rather than being idealised workers who are part of a Socialist utopia in the process of creation. As such, social realism allows more space for the subjectivity of the author to be displayed.

Partly, social realism developed as a reaction against Romanticism, which promoted lofty concepts such as the "ineffable" beauty and truth of art and music and even turned them into spiritual ideals. As such, social realism focused on the "ugly realities of contemporary life and sympathized with working class people, particularly the poor." (The quotation is from George Shi, of the University of Fine Arts, Valencia).

Features
Kitchen sink realism involves working class settings and accents, including accents from Northern England. The films and plays often explore taboo subjects such as adultery, pre-marital sex, abortion, and crime.

Origins of the term
In the United Kingdom, the term "kitchen sink" derived from an expressionist painting by John Bratby that contained an image of a kitchen sink. Bratby did various kitchen and bathroom-themed paintings, including three paintings of toilets. Bratby's paintings of people often depicted the faces of his subjects as desperate and unsightly. Kitchen sink realism artists painted everyday objects, such as trash cans and beer bottles. The critic David Sylvester wrote an article in 1954 about trends in recent English art, calling his article "The Kitchen Sink" in reference to Bratby's picture. Sylvester argued that there was a new interest among young painters in domestic scenes, with stress on the banality of life. Other artists associated with the kitchen sink style include Derrick Greaves, Edward Middleditch and Jack Smith.

1950s to 1960s
Before the 1950s, the United Kingdom's working class were often depicted stereotypically in Noël Coward's drawing room comedies and British films. Kitchen sink realism was seen as being in opposition to the "well-made play", the kind which theatre critic Kenneth Tynan once denounced as being set in "Loamshire", of dramatists like Terence Rattigan. "Well-made plays" were a dramatic genre from nineteenth-century theatre which found its early 20th-century codification in Britain in the form of William Archer's Play-Making: A Manual of Craftmanship (1912), and in the United States with George Pierce Baker's Dramatic Technique (1919). Kitchen sink works were created with the intention of changing all that. Their political views were initially labeled as radical, sometimes even anarchic.

John Osborne's play Look Back in Anger (1956) depicted young men in a way that is similar to the then-contemporary "Angry Young Men" movement of film and theatre directors. The "angry young men" were a group of mostly working and middle class British playwrights and novelists who became prominent in the 1950s. Following the success of the Osborne play, the label "angry young men" was later applied by British media to describe young writers who were characterised by a disillusionment with traditional British society. The hero of Look Back In Anger is a graduate, but he is working in a manual occupation. It dealt with social alienation, the claustrophobia and frustrations of a provincial life on low incomes.

The impact of this work inspired Arnold Wesker, Shelagh Delaney, and numerous others, to write plays of their own. The English Stage Company at the Royal Court Theatre, headed by George Devine and Theatre Workshop organised by Joan Littlewood were particularly prominent in bringing these plays to public attention. Critic John Heilpern wrote that Look Back in Anger expressed such "immensity of feeling and class hatred" that it altered the course of English theatre. The term "Angry theatre" was coined by critic John Russell Taylor.

This was all part of the British New Wave—a transposition of the concurrent nouvelle vague film movement in France, some of whose works, such as The 400 Blows of 1959, also emphasised the lives of the urban proletariat. British filmmakers such as Tony Richardson and Lindsay Anderson (see also Free Cinema) channelled their vitriolic anger into film making. Confrontational films such as Saturday Night and Sunday Morning (1960) and A Taste of Honey (1961) were noteworthy movies in the genre. Saturday Night and Sunday Morning is about a young machinist who spends his wages at weekends on drinking and having a good time, until his affair with a married woman leads to her getting pregnant and him being beaten by her husband's cousins to the point of hospitalisation. A Taste of Honey is about a 16-year old schoolgirl with an abusive, alcoholic mother. The schoolgirl starts a relationship with a black sailor and gets pregnant. After the sailor leaves on his ship, Jo moves in with a homosexual acquaintance who assumes the role of surrogate father. A Taste of Honey raises the issues of class, race, gender and sexual orientation.

Later, as many of these writers and directors diversified, kitchen sink realism was taken up by television directors who produced television plays. The single play was then a staple of the medium, and Armchair Theatre (1956–68), produced by the ITV contractor ABC, The Wednesday Play (1964–70) and Play for Today (1970–84), both BBC series, contained many works of this kind. Jeremy Sandford's television play Cathy Come Home (1966, directed by Ken Loach for The Wednesday Play slot) for instance, addressed the issue of homelessness.

Kitchen sink realism was used in the novels of Stan Barstow, John Braine, Alan Sillitoe and others.

Since the 1960s
The influence of kitchen sink realism has continued in the work of many more recent British directors, most notably Ken Loach (whose first directorial roles were in late 1960s kitchen sink dramas) and Mike Leigh. Other directors to continue working within the spirit of kitchen sink realism include Shane Meadows, Andrea Arnold, Clio Barnard, and Lynne Ramsay. The term "neo kitchen sink" has been used for films such as Leigh's 2004 Vera Drake.

List of films

Look Back in Anger (1959)
Room at the Top (1959)
Saturday Night and Sunday Morning (1960)
The Entertainer (1960)
A Taste of Honey (1961)
A Kind of Loving (1962)
The L-Shaped Room (1962)
The Loneliness of the Long Distance Runner (1962)
This Sporting Life (1963)
Billy Liar (1963)
A Place to Go (1963)
Bitter Harvest (1963)
Sparrows Can't Sing (1963)
The Leather Boys (1964)
 The Comedy Man (1964)
This Is My Street (1964)
Alfie (1966)
Georgy Girl (1966)
The Family Way (1966)
Poor Cow (1967)
Up the Junction (1968)
Kes (1969)
Bronco Bullfrog (1969)
Spring and Port Wine (1970)

List of plays

Look Back In Anger (1956)
My Flesh, My Blood (Radio play, 1957)
A Taste Of Honey (1958)
Sparrows Can't Sing (1960)
Alfie (1963)
Up the Junction (TV play, 1965)
Cathy Come Home (TV play, 1966)

See also
Ashcan School – equivalent American art movement
Italian neorealism
Naturalism

References

External links
"Beyond the Kitchen Sink" on BBC Radio 4 (2017)
BFI: British New Wave
Tucker, David, ed. British Social Realism in the Arts Since 1940, London: Palgrave Macmillan, 2011.

Cinema of the United Kingdom
English drama
English literary movements
Modern art
Social realism
Theatre in the United Kingdom
Theatrical genres
1950s in British cinema
1950s in British television